Hypobarathra is a genus of moths of the family Noctuidae.

Species
 Hypobarathra icterias (Eversmann, 1843)
 Hypobarathra repetita (Butler, 1889)

References
Natural History Museum Lepidoptera genus database
Hypobarathra at funet

Hadenini